Nityanand Haldipur (born 7 May 1948) is a performer and teacher of the Indian bamboo flute, known in India as the bansuri. He is a purist in the true Maihar Gharana tradition and learned from Ma Annapurna Devi, in  Mumbai, India. He has been rated as a "Top Grade" artist by the All India Radio and was awarded the prestigious Sangeet Natak Academi award in 2010.

Musical profile

Student life 
Nityanand was born in Mumbai into a musical family and showed indications of prodigious abilities at a very young age. His father, Niranjan Haldipur, a senior disciple of Pannalal Ghosh, initiated him into the art of flute-playing. Over the next two decades, Nityanand's training continued under the late Chidanand Nagarkar, and Devendra Murdeshwar. Since 1986, Nityanand has been learning from Padma Bhushan Srimati Annapurna Devi, doyenne of the Maihar gharana.

Musical oeuvre

Performer 
He has performed at various musical events worldwide:
 India  - New Delhi - South Asian Association For Regional Cooperation(SAARC) summit, Ahmedabad, Ajmer, Allahabad, Alwar, Amravati, Aurangabad, Bangalore.

Composer 
Haldipur has composed music for several radio shows and for wellness programs like spiritual healing therapy, stress management and art of relaxation. He has collaborated with musicians of different genres like Robert Giannetti.

Awards
Haldipur has received the following awards:

Dr. Mallikarjun Mansur award by the State Government of Karnataka - 2022

Tansen Sanman award by the Government of Madhya Pradesh - 2021

 Sangeet Natak Akademi Award (2010).

Swarasadhan Samiti conferred: - Swara Sadhna Ratna

Sahara International: - Life time achievement award

Sanskritik Foundation New Delhi conferred Fellowship

Odisa Akademy of Tribal Culture Research & Arts: - Bharat Gaurav. 

Amulya Jyoti Foundation: - Venu Ratna.

Salt Lake Kolkata: - Jadubhatt Award.

See also 
Hindustani classical music
Indian musical instruments
Bansuri/Flute

Notes

External links 
Nityanand Haldipur Official Website
Underscore records

1948 births
Hindustani instrumentalists
Indian male composers
Indian flautists
Bansuri players
Living people
Maihar gharana
Musicians from Mumbai
Performers of Hindu music
Recipients of the Sangeet Natak Akademi Award